Bukombe District is one of the five districts in Geita Region of Tanzania. Its administrative centre is the town of Ushirombo.

Prior to March 2012, it was one of the eight districts of the Shinyanga Region.

According to the 2012 census, the population of Bukombe District was 224,542.

Wards 

Bukombe District is divided administratively into 15 wards:

 Bugelenga
 Bukombe
 Bulega
 Busonzo
 Butinzya
 Igulwa
 Iyogelo
 Katente 
 Lyambamgongo
 Namonge
 Ng'anzo
 Runzewe Mashariki
 Runzewe Magharibi
 Ushirombo
 Uyovu

References

Districts of Geita Region